Broadway Academy (formerly Broadway School) is a coeducational secondary school and sixth form with academy status, located in the Perry Barr area of Birmingham, England.

Originally known as  Broadway School, the school building was rebuilt in 2010 as part of the Building Schools for the Future programme. The new building was officially opened by the Prince Edward, Duke of Kent in 2011. The school converted to academy status in July 2013, and was renamed Broadway Academy.

References

External links
 

Educational institutions established in 1972
Secondary schools in Birmingham, West Midlands
1972 establishments in England
Academies in Birmingham, West Midlands
Perry Barr